Women's film festivals are film events geared to promote women in the film industry. Women’s film festivals began due to the lack of female voice within the film industry. To combat this hindrance, their own film festival was designed. Most women's film festivals only screen films directed, produced, or written by women. Some film festivals only invite women to attend. Sometimes, some events or awards are also geared towards men, if their work promotes women's career paths or visibility in the industry.

See also 
 International Women's Film Festival (disambiguation)
 List of film festivals
 List of LGBT film festivals
 List of LGBT-related films directed by women

References

External links 
 Top Women's Film Festivals, Raindance
 The Ten Best Female-Focused Film Festivals, Film Daily
 Discover 100+ Women’s Film Festivals Worldwide, Hollywomen
 Ten Women's Film Fesivals (2018), The Women's Direction

Women

Women-related lists